Praha Masarykovo nádraží (Prague Masaryk railway station) is a terminal railway station near Republic Square (náměstí Republiky) in the New Town area of Prague, Czech Republic.

It was the first railway station in the city to serve steam trains, and the second oldest railway station in Prague (the first is Praha-Dejvice, formerly Bruska on the Lány Horse-drawn Railway). The station was designed by Antonín Jüngling and came into service in 1845.

During the Prague uprising against German occupation in 1945, the station was captured by the Waffen-SS on 8 May and 53 surrendered resistance fighters and noncombatants were massacred.

Nowadays the station only serves regional and suburban trains, because the larger Praha hlavní nádraží does not have enough capacity. In 2010 it served 48,838 trains and 9.6 million passengers. The station is currently being reconstructed, and will become the terminus of the planned railway connection with Václav Havel Airport Prague.

Names

Since it opened in 1845, Masaryk Railway Station has had the following names:

 1845–1862 Praha - "Prague"
 1862–1919 Praha státní nádraží - "Prague State Station"
 1919–1940 Praha Masarykovo nádraží - Prague Masaryk Station
 1940–1945 Praha Hybernské nádraží - Prague Hibernia Station, the station is on Hybernská street
 1945–1952 Praha Masarykovo nádraží
 1953–1990 Praha střed - Prague Central
 March 1990– Praha Masarykovo nádraží

For much of its existence, the station has been named after the founder of Czechoslovakia, Tomáš Garrigue Masaryk.

Services

References 

Masarykovo
Railway stations opened in 1845
Anton Jüngling railway stations
Railway stations in the Czech Republic opened in 1845